Philippe Giusiano (born 1973, in Marseille) is a French classical pianist.

In 1990, he took part at the XII International Chopin Piano Competition, where he obtained an Honourable Mention. Five years later, Giusiano took part in the XIII competition and made it to the finals along with Alexei Sultanov and Gabriela Montero. With the 1st prize being declared void, Giusiano and Sultanov shared the 2nd prize. His career took a real turn in 1995, when he won the Second Grand Prize at the Warsaw Chopin International Piano Competition, no first prize having been awarded.

Giusiano's teachers have included Odile Poisson (Conservatoire de Marseille), Pierre Barbizet (idem ), Jean-Claude Pennetier (Paris Conservatory), Jacques Rouvier (idem), Karl-Heinz Kämmerling (Universität Mozarteum Salzburg), and Jan Wijn (Conservatorium van Amsterdam).

References
  Piano Bleu
  Fryderyk Chopin Information Centre
  Fryderyk Chopin Society's 1995 Chopin Competition Website
  International Holland Music Sessions

21st-century French male classical pianists
1973 births
Musicians from Marseille
Living people
Prize-winners of the International Chopin Piano Competition